Jeffrey Lyons (born November 5, 1944) is an American television and film critic based in the New York metropolitan area.

Early life
Lyons was born in Manhattan, one of the four sons of Sylvia R. (Schoenberger) and Leonard Lyons, a newspaper columnist. His godfather was the playwright Sidney Kingsley and his godmother was the actress Madge Evans. As a teenager, he trained as a field goal kicker with the New York Giants for three seasons (1961–63) and studied bullfighting for seven summers in Spain with Antonio Ordonez, characterized by Ernest Hemingway (a mutual friend) as "the greatest matador of them all" in The Dangerous Summer.

He received his undergraduate degree in journalism from the University of Pennsylvania before earning a J.D. from the Syracuse University School of Law in 1969. During this period, he studied acting with Lee Strasberg at the Lee Strasberg Theater Institute.

Career
Lyons began his professional career working on the city desk of The Jersey Journal, writing sports and obituaries. After publishing a story as an intern on the Metropolitan desk of The New York Times, he covered the two national political conventions of 1968 for WINS.

From 1970 to 1991, Lyons was the film critic for WPIX. Following the departure of Roger Ebert and Gene Siskel, he co-hosted the PBS movie review show Sneak Previews from 1982 to 1996. He also appeared on MSNBC's At the Movies from 2004 to 2006 with his son, fellow critic and television personality Ben Lyons. On American AM radio, he hosted a show, "The Lyons Den," on WCBS (AM) from 1975 to 1993; the title is taken from the New York Post column that his father wrote for 40 years. He joined WNBC in 1996 as the station's film and theatre critic. His last report on WNBC was on June 26, 2009. He reported during Live at Five and NewsChannel 4 newscasts. Lyons created and co-hosted the NBC syndicated movie review TV show Lyons & Bailes Reel Talk from 2005-09. He currently hosts a syndicated radio program called "LYONS DEN RADIO" and appears on several national TV shows talking movies.  In addition to his work as a critic, he has appeared as himself in The French Connection, Deathtrap, and the TV series Wiseguy.

Lyons is the author or co-author of seven books, including Jeffrey Lyons' 101 Great Movies for Kids. He and his brother Douglas have written several baseball trivia books, Out of Left Field, Curveballs and Screwballs, and Short Hops and Foul Tips. He's recently had two books published, Stories My Father Told Me: Notes From 'The Lyons Den''', about his father's iconic Broadway column, and Catching Heat'', co-authored with his brother Douglas and former Yankee Jim Leyritz, whose biography it is.  Jeffrey and Douglas Lyons have lectured at the Smithsonian Institution and at the National Baseball Hall of Fame and Museum in Cooperstown, New York. Lyons has been a guest announcer, both as play-by-play and analyst, for the Boston Red Sox radio network and Red Sox games in Spanish.

Lyons has received two honorary degrees, from Hofstra University in 2000 and St. Mary's College in 2002. He also holds a Juris Doctor degree from Syracuse Law School.  Lyons' son is the television personality and movie critic Ben Lyons, who also uses the name "The Lyons Den" in his own work as a critic and correspondent first on the E! Channel's "E!News" for five seasons, and since March, 2012, is now on "EXTRA," the nationally syndicated program. Ben has appeared on "Good Morning, America","The Joy Behar Show","The Bonnie Hunt Show," CNN, SPIKE TV, guest hosts on ESPN Radio in Los Angeles and is the N.Y. Knicks' "Super Fan" in videos appearing on their website. Ben was recently named Director of Content and The Voice of the Fan for Derek Jeter's new "Players' Tribune" platform, and also hosts a weekly XM/Sirius radio show for the site. He's also an ESPN-LA radio anchor. Jeffrey did segments on upcoming films with his son on "EXTRA." He also appeared on some 20 editions of "Bookmark" on RLTV which continue to be seen in reruns.  In January, 2012, he returned to WCBS radio and national syndication with "LYONS DEN RADIO", reviewing five movies a week. In April, 2014, he won five New York Emmys for his work on "The Lineup" on Madison Square Garden TV (MSG), choosing the five best movies in eight sports over eight programs on a panel with Spike Lee, actors Robert Wuhl and Chazz Palmentieri, hosted by former Yankee Fran Healey.  He has since taped another series of shows on the best movies about New York again with Spike Lee, and actors John Leguziamo and Ed Burns.

In February, 2014, he signed a contract with Abbeville Press to write a sequel to "Stories My Father Told Me, Notes From The Lyons Den," called "What A Time It Was! More Notes From The Lyons Den," also about his father's era as a New York Broadway columnist. The book was published in September 2015.

Since 2015, Lyons has hosted, co-hosted or keynoted international film festivals in San Diego; Sedona, Arizona; Vero Beach, Florida; Aiken, South Carolina and The Bahamas.

Filmography

References

External links
 

1944 births
Living people
American film critics
20th-century American Jews
American television journalists
New York (state) television reporters
Journalists from New York City
American male journalists
21st-century American Jews